Theodosius of Skopje (1846–1926) was a  Bulgarian religious figure from Macedonia who was also a scholar and translator of the Bulgarian language. He was initially involved in the struggle for an autonomous Bulgarian Church and later in his life, he became a member of the Bulgarian Academy of Sciences. Although he was named Metropolitan Bishop of the Bulgarian Exarchate in Skopje, he is known for his failed attempt to establish a separate Macedonian Church as a restoration of the Archbishopric of Ohrid. Theodosius of Skopje is considered a Bulgarian in Bulgaria and an ethnic Macedonian in North Macedonia.

Biography

Theodosius of Skopje was born as Vasil Iliev Gologanov (Bulgarian & Macedonian: Васил Илиев Гологанов) in the then Slavic populated village of Tarlis (now part of Kato Nevrokopi, Greece) in the Ottoman Empire. His brother Ivan Gologanov was a collector of folk songs, most famous for editing the book Veda Slovena. Vasil studied in the classical Greek gymnasium in Serres. In 1862 Theodosius became a monk in the monastery of Saint John Prodromus near Serres, and later was ordained as a hierodeacon from the Greek Patriarch of Constantinople. Sometime in 1867, he left for Hercegovina, where he worked as a protosingel of Metropolitan Prokopius. After he came back to Bulgarian lands in 1868, Theodosius became a priest in Plovdiv and then in Krichim. In Plovdiv (1867 – 1878), he contacted famous Bulgarian National Revival activists such as  Yoakim Gruev, Nayden Gerov and Dragan Manchov. When the Bulgarian Exarchate was established in 1870 he joined it. While in the Krichim Monastery (1869 – 1873), he hid the founder of the Internal Revolutionary Organization, Vasil Levski, who at that time formed a revolutionary committee there. 

From 1873 he headed the Bulgarian church community in Serres but under the pressure from the Patriarchate of Constantinople, he was arrested by the Ottomans, tortured and received threats to his life, In 1874 he was imprisoned in Sеrres by the Ottoman authorities on charges of his involvement in the Bulgarian revolutionary movement in the Plovdiv region. Later Theodosius was released with the assistance of the Greek Metropolitan, and due to the strong pressure to be set free, he renounced the Exarchate. However, in the same year, after the Christian population of the bishoprics of Skopje and Ohrid voted overwhelmingly in favour of joining the Exarchate, Theodossius repentеd and the Bulgarian Holy Synod restored him to communion. Between 1874 and 1875 Theodosius was the head of the local Bulgarian Orthodox Church organization in the region of Serres. He was ordained as an archmandrite in 1875 and became an assistant of the Metropolitan of Nish, who at the time was under the jurisdiction of the Bulgarian Exarch. In 1876 -1877 he was in Istanbul again served in the Bulgarian St. Stephen Church. Between 1878 and 1880 Archimandrite Theodosius performed there the duties of Exarch Joseph I, since the exarch was stuck in Plovdiv after the start of the Russo-Turkish War. 

Afterwards Theodosius continued to hold high ranking positions within the Exarchate. From 1880 to 1885 he was a representative of the Exarchate at the Sublime Porte, and in 1885 he was chosen as a bishop of the episcopacy of Skopje However under the pressure of the Ecumenical Patriarch of Constantinople the Sultan issued official ordinance only in 1890 and he has to wait five years to take office. Meanwhile, in 1887 he met with Kosta Grupchev and Naum Evrov, agents of the Serbian politician Stojan Novakovic, representatives of the so-called Association of Serbo-Macedonians. The organization was headed by Novakovic, who at the time was Serbia's plenipotentiary minister in the Ottoman capital. The Serbian government then supported the Macedonist ideas to counteract the Bulgarian influence in Macedonia, and planned the gradual Serbianisation of the Macedonian Slavs. As a result of these meetings, Theodosius came under their influence. Afterwards, as a bishop of Skopje (1890-1891), Theodosius renounced de facto again the Bulgarian Exarchate and attempted to restore the Archbishopric of Ohrid and to separate the episcopacies in Macedonia from the Bulgarian Exarchate. His plans were to create a Macedonian Uniat Church with help from Bishop of Rome, but they failed soon. At first the Bulgarian  Exarchate waited, but after the first Serbian high school was opened in Skopje in 1891, with the consent of Theodosius, Bulgarian patience ran out.

At the insistence of the Exarchate at the end of 1891, he was extradited by the Ottomans to Istanbul. Despite Theodosius repented he was fired there from his high position by the Exarchate in 1892 because of his separatism. According to Simeon Radev, bishop Theodosius' separatism stemmed from his personal hatred of Exarch Joseph I. Petko Slaveykov believed Theodosius' Macedonism was inspired by the Greek propaganda and in fact his activity was favorably regarded by pro-Greek activists. Most of the Macedonian specialists on the history of the Macedonian Orthodox Church, consider that the religious separatism of Theodosius represented indeed a form of early Macedonian nationalism. He was overthrown by the Exarchate and exiled in the Dragalevtsi Monastery near Sofia. There he spent the period from 1892 to 1901, when he was engaged in translations of fiction and religious literature and as before demonstrated a pro-Bulgarian position on the Macedonian Question. 

As result he was rehabilitated and between 1901 and 1906 served as bishop of the Plovdiv eparchy, and then in the  Bachkovo Monastery and in the Rila monastery. In 1910 he tried again to run for Metropolitan of Skopje, whose position was then vacant, but he was refused, despite the pro-Exarchate positions he demonstrated in the press. During 1913 he participated on the Christianization of the Pomaks in the Rhodopes, a mission held from the Bulgarian Exarhate and IMORO. Completely repenting of his Catholic aspirations, he wrote the pamphlet The Orthodox Church and Catholic Propaganda, which the Synod printed and used in the struggle against the Uniate movement in 1914. During this period he served in Sofia, where in November 1915, when the Bulgarian army defeated Serbian troops in Macedonia, he performed a solemn prayer on the occasion of the Victory Day. Bishop Theodosius also led the short-lived eparchy of Gyumyurdzhina, (Komotini) between 1915 and 1919, when the area was part of Bulgaria. He spent the last years of his life in Sofia in literary activity - writing books and translations of foreign literature.

Since 1910, Theodosius was a member of the Bulgarian Academy of Sciences, he wrote articles on religion and translated into Bulgarian some of the works of Virgil, François-René de Chateaubriand, John Milton and others. In one of his articles, published in the newspaper "Mir", he first claimed that the forefather of the Bulgarian National Revival, Saint Paisius of Hilendar had been born in Bansko, Pirin Macedonia, contributing significantly to the construction of the image of Macedonia as a source of the Bulgarian National Revival.

See also 
 Bulgarian Exarchate
 Macedonian Question
 Macedonian Orthodox Church

Gallery

References

External links
 
 

1846 births
1926 deaths
People from Kato Nevrokopi
Bulgarian Orthodox priests
Members of the Bulgarian Academy of Sciences
Bulgarian translators
Early Macedonists
Macedonian priests
19th-century Eastern Orthodox priests
20th-century Eastern Orthodox priests
Writers from Skopje